The 2017 Red Bull Air Race of Budapest was the fourth round of the 2017 Red Bull Air Race World Championship season, the eleventh season of the Red Bull Air Race World Championship. The event was held on the Danube in Budapest, Hungary.

Master Class

Qualification

  Incorrect passing (Incorrect Level Flying) at gate 8 
  Exceeding Maximum G in gate 13 
  Exceeding Maximum G in gate 7

Round of 14

  due to technical issues
  Exceeding Maximum G in gate 18 
  Exceeding Maximum G in gate 7

Round of 8

 Incorrect passing (Sinking in the gate) at gate 19 
 Incorrect passing (Climbing in the gate) at gate 7 
 Incorrect passing (Incorrect Level Flying) at gate 17 
 Exceeding Maximum G in gate 7 
 Incorrect passing (Sinking in the gate) at gate 8

Final 4

  Incorrect passing (Climbing in the gate) at Gate 18

Challenger Class

Results

 Incorrect passing (Incorrect Level Flying) at gate 3 
 Incorrect passing (Incorrect Level Flying) at gate 6, Incorrect passing (Climbing in the gate) at gate 18 
 Incorrect passing (Flying too high) at gate 5, Incorrect passing (Incorrect Level Flying) at gate 11

Standings after the event

Master Class standings

Challenger Class standings

References

External links
 Red Bull Air Race of Budapest Result

|- style="text-align:center"
|width="35%"|Previous race:2017 Red Bull Air Race of Chiba
|width="30%"|Red Bull Air Race2017 season
|width="35%"|Next race:2017 Red Bull Air Race of Kazan
|- style="text-align:center"
|width="35%"|Previous race:2016 Red Bull Air Race of Budapest
|width="30%"|Red Bull Air Race of Budapest
|width="35%"|Next race:2018 Red Bull Air Race of Budapest
|- style="text-align:center"

Budapest
Red Bull Air Race World Championship
Red Bull Air Race World Championship